Arbëreshë people are ethnic Albanians settled in Southern Italy, or their descendants. Some have achieved notability in a wide variety of fields, in Italy or in other countries.

Prime Ministers of Italy
 Francesco Crispi  –  Italy's Prime Minister from 1887 until 1891, among the main protagonists of the Italian Risorgimento.

Politics

 Anthony Albanese - Prime Minister of Australia.
 Giorgio Basta  –  General of Holy Roman Empire
 Antonio Gramsci  –  Philosopher, writer, politician and political theorist – founding member and leader of the Communist Party of Italy
 Juan Pedro Aladro Kastriota –  Spanish-Arbereshe nobleman, diplomat, and pretender of the throne of Albania
 Giuseppe Salvatore Bellusci –  Politician.
 Nicola Barbato  –  Doctor and politician, among the founders of the movement of the Fasci Siciliani Workers
 Joseph J. DioGuardi  –  Former US Congressman
 Victor Hugo Schiro  –  Two-term mayor (17 July 1961 – 2 May 1970) of New Orleans, Louisiana
 Terenzio Tocci  –  Politician
 Sal Albanese  –  Politician
 Mario Tanassi –  Italian politician, who was several times Minister of the Italian Republic
 Richard Caliguiri – Politician
 Basilio Giordano – Italian and Canadian politician and journalist
 Gennaro Placco - poet and prominent activist of the Risorgimento
 Stefano Rodotà - jurist and politician
 Marco Osnato - Italian politician

Science and academia
 Girolamo de Rada  –  Author and important figure of the Albanian National Awakening
 Giulio Variboba  –  Poet
 Giuseppe Serembe  –  Lyric poet.
 Carmine Abate  –  Novelist and short story writer.
 Domenico Bellizzi a.k.a. Vorea Ujko  –  Priest and poet
 Mario Bellizzi  –  Poet
 Bernardo Bilotta  –  Priest, poet and folklorist
 Demetrio Camarda  –  Byzantine rite priest, Albanian language scholar, historian, and philologist
 Nicola Chetta  –  Byzantine rite priest, ethnographic, writer and poet
 Giuseppe Crispi  –  Priest and philologist, one of the major figures of the Arbëresh community of Sicily of his time
 Giuseppe Schirò  –  Poet, linguist, publicist, folklorist and Albanian patriot, among the most representative figures of the Arbëreshë literature of the 19th century
 Gabriele Dara   –  Politician and poet, regarded as one of the early writers of the Albanian National Awakening.
 Leonardo Lala  –  Italian writer 
 Giuseppe Schirò Di Maggio  –  Poet, journalist, essayist, playwright and writer, among the most influential and prolific exponents of contemporary Arbëreshë literature
 Eleuterio Francesco Fortino  –  Priest of the Italo-Albanian Church in Calabria and writer of the Bizantine and Albanian culture
 Angelo Masci  –  Writer
 Luca Matranga  – Byzantine rite priest, one of the first writers in Albanian
 Francesco Antonio Santori  –  Writer, playwright and poet of the Albanian National Awakening
 Ferruccio Baffa Trasci  –  Bishop, theologian and philosopher
 Vincenzo Dorsa  –  scholar, writer and translator
 Tom Perrotta  –  American novelist and screenwriter
 Marco La Piana  –  Italian scholar of Arbëresh origin
 Ernesto Sabato  –   Argentine novelist, essayist, painter and physicist
 Maria Antonia Braile  –  Italian-arbëreshë writer and the first Albanian woman writer to ever publish literature in Albanian
 Francesco Altimari  –  Italian scholar in the field of Albanology
 Pasquale Scutari  –  Italian linguist and Albanologist
 Giuseppe Schirò (junior)  –  Italian scholar and literary historian

Literature
 Daniela Gioseffi – poet, novelist, literary critic, essayist, and performer
 Pema Browne – American abstract artist
 Kristina Gentile Mandala – Albanian writer

Military
 Mercurio Bua  –   Famed condottiero (stratioti captain) and commander of the Venetian army
 Theodore Bua  –   Albanian captain of stradioti regiments of the Republic of Venice
 Demetrio Reres –  Calabrian nobleman
 Khoja Zufar  –    Captain, governor, merchant and General
 Demetrio Capuzzimati  –   Stradiot captain in Puglia
 Joseph N. Macaluso Sr. –  veteran of World War II

Business and civil society
 Enrico Cuccia –  Banker, founder of Mediobanca and important figure in Italian post-war industrial reconstruction.
 James J. Schiro –  American business man
 Nicolas Berggruen –  Philanthropist and investor
 Anselmo Lorecchio –  Italian lawyer, journalist, politician, poet and writer
 Luigi Giura –  Engineer and architect.
 Ercole Lupinacci –  Bishop of the Italo-Albanian Church of Eparchy of Lungro.
 Ofelia Giudicissi Curci –  Italian poet and archeologist
 Vaccaro brothers  –  Italian-American businessmen
 Andrew Kaczynski - Journalist and editor for CNN.

Religious
 Sotir Ferrara  –  Bishop of the Italo-Albanian Church of Eparchy of Piana degli Albanesi.
 Pope Clement XI Pope of Italy during the early 1700s
 Giovanni Mele - Bishop of the Eparchy of Lungro, a discese of the Italo-Albanian Catholic Church in Calabria, Italy
 Donato Oliverio  –  Bishop of the Eparchy of Lungro, a diocese of the Italo-Albanian Catholic Church in Calabria, Italy
 Giorgio Demetrio Gallaro  –  Bishop of the Eparchy of Piana degli Albanesi, a diocese of the Italo-Albanian Catholic Church in Sicily, Italy
 Nikollë Filja  –  Arbëreshë Byzantine rite priest, and writer of the 18th century
 Antonio Ciliberti  –  Roman Catholic archbishop
 Gian Girolamo Albani  –  Italian Roman Catholic cardinal
 Giuseppe Schirò (archbishop)  –  Arbëreshë writer of the 18th century
 Ferruccio Baffa Trasci  –  Italian bishop, theologian and philosopher
 Eleuterio Francesco Fortino  –  Italian priest of the Italo-Albanian Catholic Church
 Pietro Parente  –  Long-serving theologian in the Holy Office of the Roman Catholic Church
 Raffaele Castielli  –  Italian bishop
 Arberia Parish  –  Eastern Orthodox Christian parish

Cinema
 Danny DeVito - American actor
 Regis Philbin  –  American media personality and occasional actor and singer
 Aleksandër Moisiu  –  Austrian stage actor
 Stanley Tucci - American actor
 Bettina Moissi  –  German stage and film actress
 Gedeon Burkhard  –  German film and television actor
 Nick Mancuso  –  Italian-born Canadian actor and playwright
 Alan Barillaro  –  Canadian director, animator and writer
 J. J. Philbin  –   American producer and screenwriter
 Aroldo Tieri  –  Italian actor
 Mario Sábato  –  Argentine film director and screenwriter
 Mike Bongiorno  –  Italian-American television host
 Mitchel Musso  –  American actor, musician, and singer
 Tracee Chimo – actress 
 Greg Cipes – American actor, voice actor, singer, musician, and professional surfer
 Antonio Albanese – Italian comedian, actor, director and writer

Arts and entertainment
 Ernesto Baffa  -  Argentine Tango musician
 Marco Basaiti  –  Renaissance painter
 Michael Bellusci – Musician and Drummer
 Olivier Berggruen  –  German-American art historian and curator
 Bino  –  Italian rock percussionist and actor
 Gabriella Cilmi  –  Australian singer-songwriter
 Drita D'Avanzo – television personality
 Kara DioGuardi  –  American singer-songwriter, record producer, music publisher, A&R executive, composer and TV personality
 Salvatore Frega -  Italian composer of contemporary cultured music and experimental music
 Joe Lala  –  American rock percussionist and actor
 Cosimo Damiano Lanza  –  Italian pianist, harpsichordist and composer
 Soledad Onetto  –  Chilean TV presenter
 Steven Parrino – American artist and musician associated with energetic punk nihilism
 Michele Perniola  –  Italian singer, best known for representing San Marino at the Junior Eurovision Song Contest 2013
 Renzo Rubino  –  Italian pop singer songwriter
 Bobbi Starr – pornographic actress
 Tito Schipa  –  Italian tenor
 Tito Schipa Jr.  –  Portuguese-born Italian composer, singer-songwriter, producer, writer and actor
 Nik Spatari  –  Italian painter, sculptor, architect and art scholar

Models
 Cecilia Bolocco  –  Chilean actress, TV Host and beauty queen who was crowned Miss Universo Chile 1987 and Miss Universe 1987
 Diana Bolocco  –  Chilean journalist, known as sister of Cecilia Bolocco, Miss Universe 1987
 Valeria Mazza  –  Argentine model
 Graciela Alfano  –  Argentine artist, model, actress and vedette

Sports
 Roman Reigns - American professional wrestler.
 Antonio Candreva  –  Italian footballer
 Tatiana Búa  –  Argentine tennis player
 Giuseppe Bellusci  –  Italian footballer
 Mateo Musacchio  –  Argentine footballer
 Darío Benedetto  –  Argentine professional footballer who plays as a striker for Boca Juniors
 Daniel Caligiuri  –  German professional footballer who plays as a midfielder for Schalke 04 in the Bundesliga
 Marco Caligiuri  –  German footballer
 Tomás Guidara  –  Argentine professional footballer
 Andy Varipapa  –  Professional trick bowler

References

 
Arbëreshë